Ke Pauk (1934 – February 15, 2002), also known as Kae Pok, was one of the senior leaders of the Khmer Rouge.

Early life
He was born Ke Vin in Chhouk Ksach Village, Chhouk Ksach Sub-district, Baray District, Kampong Thom Province in 1934. 

In 1949, following a raid on his village by French forces, Pauk joined the Khmer Issarak independence movement. In 1954, following the Geneva Conference and Cambodia's independence from France, Pauk emerged from the forest and was soon arrested. Sentenced to six years in prison he served time in prisons in Phnom Penh and Kampong Thom. However, after spending only three years in prison, Pauk was released.

After his release in 1957, Pauk returned to Chhouk Ksach and married Soeun. Together they were to have six children. His biography states that he was contacted at this time by Party Secretary Siv Heng and asked to rejoin the movement. Pauk joined the nascent Cambodian Communist movement in Svay Teab, Chamkar Leu District, Kampong Cham.

Death
Pauk died, apparently of natural causes, while asleep in his home at Anlong Veng on 15 February 2002.

References

External links
Yale.edu
Khmer.cc
Phnompenhpost.com
Dccam.org
News.bbc.co.uk

1934 births
2002 deaths
Cambodian communists
Khmer Rouge party members
People from Kampong Thom province
Communist Party of Kampuchea politicians